Croatia participated in the Junior Eurovision Song Contest 2005. The Croatian broadcaster Hrvatska radiotelevizija (HRT) organised an national final to select the entry, being Lorena Jelusić with the song "Rock Baby".

Before Junior Eurovision

Dječja Pjesma Eurovizije 2005 
Dječja Pjesma Eurovizije 2005 was the third edition of the Croatian national selection, which selected Croatia's entry for the Junior Eurovision Song Contest 2005.

Competing entries 
Artists and composers were able to submit their entries to the broadcaster. An expert committee consisting of Nensi Atanasov, Helena Bastić, Davor Gobac, Željen Klašterka, Mladen Kušec, Marin Margitić and Nika Turković selected ten artists and songs for the competition from the received submissions.

Final 
The final took place on 3 July 2005 at HRT's Anton Marti Studio, hosted by Iva Sulentić and Robert Bošković. The winner was determined by regional televoting. For the first time in the history of Croatia's Junior Eurovision selection, the orchestra was dropped and the finalists sang to pre-recorded instrumentation, but were accompanied by in-studio backup singers.

At Junior Eurovision

Voting

Notes

References

Croatia
Junior
Junior Eurovision Song Contest